Prastara (extension, flat top) is a sort of entablature in the Hindu temple architecture.

Overview
It is a horizontal superstructure of bands and moldings above column capitals, sometimes functions as a parapet of a story. Prastara is both functional and decorative element located above the architrave of the temple. Being the third part of the building counting from the bottom, prastara is a very important element of the overall architectural composition of the temple.

Meaning
In the Dravidian context, prastara signifies a meeting place, where the two divisions of the temple, prasada varga (the Earth) and the pada varga (the Heaven), meet each other.

Parts
Prastara consists of several parts from bottom to top: uttara, valabhi (stringcourse above uttara), and kapota (dripstone). Kapota is usually shaped as a pigeon's head.

References

Hindu temple architecture